Mihai Constantinescu (born 20 August 1932–29 October 2019) was a Romanian film director and screenwriter.

Filmography

As director
 Pe litoral mi-a rămas inima (1961) 
 Opt minute de vis (1965) 
 Cîntecele mării (1971) - Assistant director
 Despre o anumită fericire (1973) 
 Tată de duminică (1975)
 Singurătatea florilor (1976)
 Premiera (1976)
 Lumini și umbre (1981-1982) -   TV movie
 Eroii nu au vârstă (1984) -  TV series
 Să-ți vorbesc despre mine (1987)
 Un oaspete la cină (1987)

As screenwriter
 Opt minute de vis (1965) 
 Să-ți vorbesc despre mine (1987)

As actor
 Dacii (1967)
 Reteaua "S" (1980)

See also
 List of Romanian film and theatre directors
 List of Romanian films

References

External links

  Mihai Constantinescu at aarc.ro

1932 births
2019 deaths
Romanian film directors
Romanian screenwriters
Romanian male film actors
People from Vâlcea County